Maharashtra Major State Highway 9 also MSH 9 is a Major State Highway that runs south through Nagpur, and Chandrapur districts in the state of Maharashtra. This state highway touches numerous cities and villages VIZ. Nagpur, Umred, Nagbhid, Mul and Chandrapur. Tadoba Andhari Tiger Project and Umred Karhandla Wildlife Sanctuary are along with this highway.

Summary 

This highway is one of the important highway  in Maharashtra state for transportation. Most of the part is passing through the forest area.

Route description 
Below is the brief summary of the route followed by this state highway.

Nagpur District 

Chandrapur District 

Major junctions

National highways 
Also National Highway 353D (India)
 Outer Ring Road, Nagpur which provide connectivity to National Highway 53 (India)(old numbering), NH-7 and NH 47 near Vhirgoan village.

State highways 
State Highway SH 3 Near NH44.

Connections 
Many villages, cities and towns in various districts are connected by this state highway.

Nagpur District

Chandrapur District

See also 
 List of State Highways in Maharashtra

References 

State Highways in Maharashtra
State Highways in Nagpur District